Newbury power station supplied electricity to the town of Newbury, Berkshire and the surrounding area from 1905 to 1970. It was owned and operated by a succession of public and private organisations. It comprised, at various times, hydro-electric, gas engine and diesel engine powered plant with a maximum output capacity of 2.57 MW.

History
The Board of Trade granted Newbury Corporation a Provisional Order in 1892 to generate and supply electricity to Newbury under the Electric Lighting Acts. This was confirmed by Parliament through the Electric Lighting Orders Confirmation (No. 3) Act 1892 (55 & 56 Vict. c. xxxviii). However, the town council did not develop the electricity undertaking.

In 1901 the Urban Electric Supply Company Limited obtained a Provisional Order to supply electricity to Newbury. The Urban Electric Supply Company was founded in 1898 to obtain Parliamentary powers to operate smaller electric light and tramway undertakings. The company's Provisional Order for Newbury was confirmed by the Electric Lighting Orders Confirmation (No. 7) Act 1901 (1 Edw. 7. c. clxxiv).

The Urban Electric Supply Company built the power station at Greenham Mill (51° 24’ 07”N, 1° 18’ 53”W) over the River Kennet and which opened in January 1905. In addition to the hydro-electric plant, gas-fired generators were installed at the power station.

Electricity was sold to customers in 1923 at 9.57 d./kWh for lighting and domestic use, and 3.26 d./kWh for power uses. The financial operating summary for the undertaking was as follows:

In 1937 the Wessex Electricity Company, assumed ownership of several small municipal and company electricity undertakings, including Newbury. The Wessex company was founded in 1927 to distribute electricity across south-west England. It aimed to modernise, rationalise and integrate the distribution networks of its constituent companies. Its share capital was wholly owned by Edmondson's Electricity Corporation Limited.

The water wheels and gas engines were decommissioned and replaced with diesel engine sets.

The British electricity supply industry was nationalised in 1948 under the provisions of the Electricity Act 1947 (10 & 11 Geo. 6 c. 54). The Newbury electricity undertaking was abolished, ownership of Newbury power station was vested in the British Electricity Authority, and subsequently the Central Electricity Authority and the Central Electricity Generating Board (CEGB). At the same time the electricity distribution and sales responsibilities of the Newbury electricity undertaking were transferred to the Southern Electricity Board (SEB).

Newbury power station closed in about 1970.

Plant equipment

Plant in 1923
The generating plant at Newbury in 1923 comprised:

 1 × 52 kW water wheel, and direct current generator
 1 × 60 kW water wheel, DC generator
 2 × 80 kW gas engines, DC generator
 2 × 200 kW gas engines, DC generator

This gave a total output of 672 kW.

Electricity was provided to customers at 480 and 240 Volts direct current.

Plant in 1955
The generating plant at Newbury in 1955 comprised:

 1 × 110 kW diesel engine set DC 500 volts
 2 × 180 kW diesel engine set DC 500 volts
 1 × 1050 kW Ruston-Peebles diesel engine set 11 kV (installed December 1954)
 1 × 1050 kW Ruston-Peebles diesel engine set 11 kV (installed January 1955)

The total generating capacity was 2.57 MW.

Operations

Operations 1921-23
Electricity supply data for 1921-23 was:

Electricity Loads on the system were:

Operations 1946-67 
The operating data for Newbury power station was:

See also
 Timeline of the UK electricity supply industry
 List of power stations in England

References

Demolished power stations in the United Kingdom
Former power stations in England
Buildings and structures in Newbury, Berkshire